Peter A. Franken (November 10, 1928 – March 11, 1999) was an American physicist who contributed to the field of nonlinear optics. He was president of the Optical Society of America in 1977.
In 1961, Professor Peter Franken and his coworkers in the Randall Laboratory at the University of Michigan observed for the first time the second-harmonic generation. This event launched a golden age in optical physics that has led to applications in fields ranging from optical communications and biological imaging to X-ray generation and homeland security. In 1985 he contributed an oral history to the American Institute of Physics in which he describes background and details of his early work.

See also

The Optical Society#OSA presidents

References

External links
 Oral history interview transcript with Peter Franken on 8 March 1985, American Institute of Physics, Niels Bohr Library & Archives
 Articles Published by early OSA Presidents Journal of the Optical Society of America

Presidents of Optica (society)
20th-century American physicists
1928 births
1999 deaths
University of Michigan faculty
Optical physicists